The Maccabee Task Force (MTF) is a fundraising group oriented against Boycott, Divestment and Sanctions movement (BDS), funded largely by Sheldon Adelson as of 2017.

History 
MTF was founded in 2015. Sheldon Adelson expressed interest in formation of three components in MTF: a donor group for funding, an on-campus activist group to propagate MTF efforts on the ground, and a researcher group to investigate anti-Israel groups and opportunities for legal challenges to them. Adelson aimed to opposed the Boycott, Divestment and Sanctions movement and the groups Students for Justice in Palestine and Muslim Student Association in particular.

Leaving his position as executive of Christians United for Israel (often shortened to CUFI), David Brog joined as MTF executive in 2015. Initial fundraising for MTF raised over $50 million. As of 2018, Brog was still executive director.

MTF's Brog says the organization concentrated its efforts on six California campuses through 2016, expanding to twenty in 2017. Brog announced at the end of the 2018–2019 school year that MTF would expand to over 100 schools.

In 2019, MTF announced that it would expand internationally in 2020, though it did not specify to which countries.

Relationship to other groups 
MTF is a major funder of Act.IL, a volunteer group that highlights and propagates pro-Israel information online.

MTF is one of the largest donors to PragerU, a conservative visual media site. PragerU promoted five videos on its front featuring MTF.

References

External links

2015 establishments
Opposition to Boycott, Divestment and Sanctions
Zionist organizations
Sheldon Adelson